Tresnuraghes is a comune (municipality) in the Province of Oristano in the Italian region Sardinia, located about  northwest of Cagliari and about  north of Oristano. The name means three nuraghes in Sardinian.

Geography
Tresnuraghes borders the following municipalities: Cuglieri, Flussio, Magomadas, Sennariolo.

Festivals
The Feast of Saint Mark is a traditional Sardinian feste, the most important one, which is a time of excess consumption that helps solidify the social community. Local shepherd families in this predominantly pastoral community offer sheep and oversee cooking them in a gesture of thanks to Providence. Other families offer bread as thanksgiving or for favors desired.  Hundreds of people, mostly from Tresnuraghes, but a large number of outsiders as well, eat and drink to satiation together.

Demographic evolution 

See table below.

References

External links

 Official website

Cities and towns in Sardinia